The 2017–18 Maritime Junior Hockey League season was the 51st season in league history. The season consisted of 50 games played by each MHL team.

At the end of the regular season, the league's top teams competed for the Kent Cup, the league's playoff championship trophy. The team successful in winning the Kent Cup competed for the 2018 Fred Page Cup to determine the Eastern Canadian Champion.

Team Changes

The Dieppe Commandos relocated from Dieppe to Edmundston and are now known as the Edmundston Blizzard

Regular-season Standings 
Note: GP = Games played; W = Wins; L = Losses; OTL = Overtime losses; SL = Shootout losses; GF = Goals for; GA = Goals against; PTS = Points; STK = Streak; x = Clinched playoff spot y = Clinched division; z = Clinched first overall

Final Standings

2018 playoffs

External links 
 Official website of the Maritime Junior Hockey League
 Official website of the Canadian Junior Hockey League

MHL
Maritime Junior Hockey League seasons